The 1991–92 Missouri Tigers men's basketball team represented the University of Missouri as a member of the Big Eight Conference during the 1991–92 NCAA men's basketball season. Led by head coach Norm Stewart, the Tigers finished third in the Big Eight Conference, lost in the quarterfinal round of the Big Eight tournament, and received a bid to the NCAA tournament as the No. 5 seed in the East region. After defeating West Virginia in the opening round, Missouri fell to Seton Hall in the second round. The Tigers finished with an overall record of 21–9 (8–6 Big Eight).

Roster

Schedule and results

 
|-
!colspan=9 style=| Regular season

|-
!colspan=9 style=| Big Eight Conference tournament

|-
!colspan=9 style=| NCAA tournament

Rankings

Team players in the 1992 NBA draft

References

Missouri
Missouri Tigers men's basketball seasons
Missouri